Hyundai RB may refer to:
                                                           
 Hyundai RB Concept (2010), a subcompact sedan concept
 Hyundai RB (buses), a line of buses